Gary Price may refer to:

 Gary Price (rugby league, born 1961), English rugby league footballer who played for York, Leeds and Featherstone Rovers.
 Gary Price (rugby league, born 1969), English rugby league footballer who played for Wakefield Trinity, Featherstone Rovers and Great Britain.
 Gary Lee Price, sculptor